A classifier is a category of Unified Modeling Language (UML) elements that have some common features, such as attributes or methods.

Overview
A classifier is an abstract metaclass classification concept that serves as a mechanism to show interfaces, classes, datatypes and components.

A classifier describes a set of instances that have common behavioral and structural features (operations and attributes, respectively).

A classifier is a namespace whose members can specify a generalization hierarchy by referencing its general classifiers.

A classifier is a type and can own generalizations, thereby making it possible to define generalization relationships to other classifiers.

A classifier is a redefinable element, as it is possible to redefine nested classifiers.

All objects that can have instances are classifiers.

Important aspects
A classifier defines a namespace.
A classifier contains a set of features.
A classifier is generalizable.

Types of UML classifiers
Class
Component
Datatype
Interface
Node
Signal
Subsystem
Use Case

Predefined UML classifiers
Actor
Association
Class
Component
Datatype
Interface
Node
Signal
Subsystem
Use Case

References

Unified Modeling Language